The house of Veniamin Marinkovic is located in Devici village in Ivanjica.

The house of Veniamin Marinkovic is an example of rural architecture in villages that are located at the foot of the mountain of Golija. Today, the monument is enlisted as an immovable cultural property.

Veniamin Marinkovic

Political activist Venijamin Marinkovic was born and lived in this house in between two wars. He was one of the leaders of the armed uprising in the Užice region. He was a teacher and a commander in the uprising. In the beginning of year 1941 he was a member of The District Committee that was located in Užice, together with Zelimir Djuric Zeljo, Vukola Dabic, Dobrilo Petrovic, Mihajlo Jevtic and Radoje Maric.
 He was killed in 1941 in Pozega.

References

Ivanjica
Houses in Serbia